Martin Kjølholdt (22 January 1938 – 12 April 1989) was a Norwegian footballer. He played for Sarpsborg FK most of his career, and was capped twice for Norway. He left the club ahead of the 1969 season to become player-coach for Rygge IL. Kjølholdt has also chaired Sarpsborg BK.

References

1938 births
1989 deaths
People from Sarpsborg
Norwegian footballers
Sarpsborg FK players
Norway international footballers
Association footballers not categorized by position
Sportspeople from Viken (county)